Barbara Carroll (born Barbara Carole Coppersmith; January 25, 1925 – February 12, 2017) was an American jazz pianist and vocalist.

Early life and career
Carroll was born in Worcester, Massachusetts. She began her classical training in piano at age eight, but by high school decided to become a jazz pianist. She attended the New England Conservatory of Music for a year, but left it as it conflicted with working for bands. In 1947 Leonard Feather dubbed her "the first girl ever to play bebop piano." In the following year her trio, which featured Chuck Wayne on guitar and Clyde Lombardi on bass, worked briefly with Benny Goodman. Later Charlie Byrd replaced Wayne and Joe Shulman replaced Lombardi.  After Byrd's departure, Carroll decided to have it be a drums, bass, and piano trio.

In the 1950s, Carroll and her trio worked on Me and Juliet by Rodgers and Hammerstein. The decade saw her career ebb due to changing musical tastes and personal concerns.

Later career
In 1972 she revived her career due to a renewed interest in her work. In 1975 she was asked by Rita Coolidge to work on a session for A&M. In 1978 she toured with Coolidge and Kris Kristofferson. In the following two decades she became known as a cabaret performer.

Personal life
In September 1954, Carroll married jazz bassist Joe Shulman, a member of the trio. He died from a heart attack in 1957 at age 33. She subsequently married agent and photographer Bert Block, with whom she had a daughter, Suzanne Block Glatt. Block died of emphysema in 1986.  In 2011, Carroll married advertising executive Mark Stroock, a union that lasted until her death at 92.

Awards and honors
In 2003, Carroll was awarded the Kennedy Center's Mary Lou Williams Women in Jazz Lifetime Achievement Award.

Carroll was honored as The New Jewish Home's Eight Over Eighty Gala 2015 honoree.

Discography

See also 
 Karrin Allyson
 Tania Maria
 Emily Elbert
 Julia Feldman
 Sitti Navarro

References

External links

Barbara Carroll at the New England Jazz History Database

1925 births
2017 deaths
Cabaret singers
American jazz singers
American jazz pianists
American women pianists
Cabaret
Caroll, Barbara
Savoy Records artists
Verve Records artists
Warner Records artists
21st-century American women